KY or Ky may refer to:

Arts and entertainment
 Ky Kiske, a fictional character in the Guilty Gear video game series
 Kashiyatra, a festival in India

People
 Nguyễn Cao Kỳ (1930-2011), South Vietnamese general and prime minister
 Ky Baldwin (born 2001), Australian singer, songwriter, dancer, and actor
 Ky Bowman (born 1997), American professional basketball player
 Ky Bush (born 1999), American MLB player
 Ky Dickens, American filmmaker, writer, and director
 Ky Ebright (1894-1979), American rowing coach
 Ky Fan (1914-2010), Chinese-born American mathematician
 Ky Furneaux (born 1973), Australian television personality and host, outdoor guide, survival expert, and stunt person
 Ky Hollenbeck (born 1987), American kickboxer
 Ky Hurst (born 1981), Australian swimmer and ironman
 Ky Laffoon (1908-1984), American professional golfer
 Ky Nam Le Duc, Vietnamese-Canadian film director and screenwriter
 Ky Rodwell (born 1999), Australian professional rugby league footballer

Places
 KY postcode area, UK (Kirkcaldy), covering most of Fife and surrounding areas in Scotland
 Kentucky, a U.S. state
 County Kerry, a county of Ireland
 Cayman Islands (ISO two-letter country code)
 .ky, top-level domain for the Cayman Islands
 Kolej Yayasan UEM, private boarding school in Malaysia
 Kyritz, a German licence plate code, for Kyritz in Brandenburg

Other uses
 K-Y Jelly, a brand of personal lubricant
 Kerosene, A fuel, can be used as industrial lubricant. Known in some countries as paraffin.
 Kyrgyz language (ISO 639 alpha-2 code KY)
 Air São Tomé and Príncipe and  Kunming Air (IATA airline designator)
 , Swedish Qualified Vocational Education
 KY Cygni, a red supergiant located in the constellation Cygnus
 A variation of the name Kye, Kai, Kay, or Cai; and as a nickname for Kyle

See also
 ΚΨ or Kappa Psi, a professional pharmacy fraternity